The Norwegian Bowling Federation (NBF) is the national body responsible for the management and promotion of bowling in Norway. It is affiliated with the International Bowling Federation. The president is Marie Paulsson Berg, and the vice president is Halgeir Ludvigsen. The headquarters are in Oslo.

External links

Ten-pin bowling in Norway